Ek Se Badhkar Ek - Chota Packet Bada Dhamaka sibi is a Hindi television reality show that aired on Zee TV channel, starting from 20 September 2008 until 3 January 2009. The show is an extension of Ek Se Badhkar Ek - Jalwe Sitaron Ke, and will be based on popular Hindi television 'Kids'. The show is a unique because it has both singing and dancing in a one platform.

Concept 
The show features popular Kids from Indian television industry who are best dancers & best singers. As its first season, this season also features 8 pairs – a singer and a dancer who are divided into teams to participate and earn points with their individual / respective skills. The finale took place on 3 January 2009. The winning jodi (team) was the team of Vasundhara and Ayush, votes being counted as 50% by the audience and 50% by the judges. The scholarship of 25 Lakh Rupees was the grand prize for the winning team. Amir/Ehsaas achieved 2nd place and Rohanpreet/Chinky achieved 3rd place. The best singer from the eliminated teams was awarded to Smita whereas the best dancer was awarded to Adrita; this decision was evaluated by the judges.

Host
Swapnil Joshi (Indian comedian)

Judges
Kunal Kohli (Bollywood director/producer) 
Annu Kapoor (Indian television presenter)
Rakhi Sawant (Bollywood dancer)
vinay ramani {Bollywood hiro }

Contestants 
 Ayush Tandon  / Vasundhara Raturi - Winners
 Anamika Choudhari / Adrita Das 
 Rohanpreet Singh / Chinky - 2nd Runner Up
 Tanmay Chaturvedi / Khushi Dubey
 Smita Nandi / Dhairya 
 Vaishali Raikwar / Dwij
 Aamir Hafeez / Apurva - 1st Runner Up
 Vibhor Parashar / Ahsaas Channa

Wildcard Entries 
 Armaan / Ananya
 Amir Hafeez / Ehsaas Channa - 1st Runner Up

Eliminated 
 Vaishali Raikwar / Dwij 
 Aamir Hafeez / Apoorva 
 Vibhor Parashar / Ehsaas Channa 
 Smita Nandi / Dhairya 
 Armaan / Ananya
 Tanmay Chaturvedi / Khushi Dubey 
 Anamika Choudhari / Adrita Das
 VINAY RAMANI / KRUPA SENGHANI

External links 
Chota Packet Fan Site
Official Site on Zee TV

Zee TV original programming
Indian reality television series
2008 Indian television series debuts
2009 Indian television series endings
UTV Television